Stephanie Mary Dalley FSA (née Page; March 1943) is a British Assyriologist and scholar of the Ancient Near East. She has retired as a teaching Fellow from the Oriental Institute, Oxford. She is known for her publications of cuneiform texts and her investigation into the Hanging Gardens of Babylon, and her proposal that it was situated in Nineveh, and constructed during Sennacherib's rule.

Biography
As a schoolgirl, Stephanie Page worked as a volunteer on archaeological excavations at Verulamium, Cirencester, and Bignor Villa. In 1962, she was invited by David Oates, a family friend, to an archaeological dig he was directing in Nimrud, northern Iraq. Here she was responsible for cleaning and conserving the discovered ivories. Between 1962 and 1966 she studied Assyriology at Newnham College, Cambridge, part of Cambridge University, and followed it up with a PhD from the School of Oriental and African Studies, London.

In the years 1966–67, Page was awarded a Fellowship by the British School of Archaeology in Iraq, and she worked at the excavation at Tell al-Rimah as Epigrapher and registrar. The tablets excavated at Tell al-Rimah formed the subject of her PhD thesis and later for a book for general readership, Mari and Karana, two Old Babylonian Cities. In Iraq she met Christopher Dalley, now a Chartered Engineer, whom she later married. Then they had three children.

From 1979 to 2007, Dalley taught Akkadian and Sumerian at the Oriental Institute, Oxford University, being appointed Shillito Fellow in Assyriology in 1988. She is an Honorary Senior Research Fellow of Somerville College, a member of Common Room at Wolfson College, and a Fellow of the Society of Antiquaries.

Dalley took part in archaeological excavations in the Aegean, Iraq, Syria, Jordan and Turkey. She has published extensively, both technical editions of texts from excavations and national museums, and more general books. She has been involved in several television documentaries.

Contributions to Assyriology

Mythology
Dalley published her own translations of the main Babylonian myths: Atrahasis, Anzu, The Descent of Ishtar, Gilgamesh, The Epic of Creation, Erra and Ishum. Collected into one volume, this work has made the Babylonian corpus accessible for the first time to the student of general mythology and it is widely used in university teaching.

The Nimrud Princesses
In 1989 the Iraqi Department of Antiquities excavated one of a series of tombs in the ancient Palace of Nimrud. A sarcophagus contained the skeletons of two women who had been buried with over 26 kg of gold objects, many of them inscribed. The inscriptions identified the women as queens from c 700 BC. Dalley showed that the name Ataliya was of Hebrew origin. The name of the other queen, Yaba could also have been Hebrew, a word possibly meaning Beautiful and equating to another, Assyrian name form Banitu which is also found on the jewellery.
She concluded that these women, probably mother and daughter as they had been buried together, were Judean princesses, probably relatives of King Hezekiah of Jerusalem, given in diplomatic marriage to the Assyrian Kings. This arrangement sheds a new light on the political relationships between Judah and Assyria at that time.
The analysis also offers an explanation for an otherwise obscure passage in the Old Testament (II Kings 18.17–28 and also Isaiah 36.11–13). The besieging Assyrian commander, who would have been a close relative of the King, calls on the people of Jerusalem advising them to abandon their rebellion. "Then Rab-shakeh stood, and cried with a loud voice in the Jews' language, and said 'Hear ye the words of the great king, the King of Assyria'". He could speak in Hebrew because he had learned it at his mother's knee.

Legacy in later cultures
In several academic articles Dalley has traced the influence of Mesopotamian culture in the Hebrew Old Testament, early Greek epics, and the Arabian Nights. In particular she has studied the transmission of the story of Gilgamesh across the cultures of the Near and Middle East and shown its persistence to the Tale of Buluqiya in the Arabian Nights, examining the evidence for Gilgamesh and Enkidu in the tale, as well as contrasting Akkadian and later Arabic stories. She has also noted the appearance of the name Gilgamesh in the Book of Enoch.

Hanging Garden of Babylon
One of the seven wonders of the ancient world, the Hanging Gardens of Babylon were not found despite extensive archaeological excavations. Dalley has suggested, based on eighteen years of textual study, that the Garden was built not at Babylon under Nebuchadnezzar, but in Nineveh, the capital of the Assyrians, by Sennacherib, around 2700 years ago. She deciphered Babylonian and Assyrian cuneiform, and reinterpreted later Greek and Roman texts, and determined that a crucial seventh century BC inscription had been mistranslated. While none of Nebuchadnezzar's inscriptions ever mentioned any gardens, Dalley found texts by Sennacherib about a palace he built and a garden alongside that he called a wonder for all people. The texts also described a water screw, pre-dating Archimedes, using a new bronze-casting methodology that raised water all day, and related these to extensive aqueducts and canals that brought water from hills eighty kilometres away. A bas-relief from Nineveh and now in the British Museum depicts a palace and trees suspended on terraces, which Dalley used as further supporting evidence. Her research confirms the description of later Greek writers that the gardens were, in fact, terraces built up like an amphitheatre around a central pond. She compiled these conclusions into her book The Mystery of the Hanging Garden of Babylon: An Elusive World Wonder Traced, published in 2013.

The Sealand
Dalley published in 2009 an archive of some 470 newly-found cuneiform texts and deduced that they had originated in a southern Mesopotamian kingdom previously known only as the Sea land which flourished c 1,500 BC. This fills a significant gap in modern historical knowledge. Her analysis of the texts has made it possible to identify tablets in other museums and collections as being from the Sealand dynasties.

Selected publications
A full list of publications up to 2014 is available on www.academia.edu

Books
 
 
 
  (Editor)
 
 
 
 
  (paperback)

Papers

Radio and Television
 BBC Horizon "Noah's Flood", 1996
 BBC Secrets of the Ancients episode 5: "Hanging Gardens of Babylon", 1999 
 BBC Radio, "Babylon and the Gilgamesh Epic". 2006
 BBC Masterpieces of the British Museum, Series 2 Episode 1, "The Assyrian Lion Hunt Reliefs", 2006 
 Channel 4 UK: "Secrets of the Dead, The Lost Gardens of Babylon", 2013
 PBS Secrets of the Dead, "The Lost Gardens of Babylon", 2014

References

Sources

External links 
 
 The Lost Gardens of Babylon on PBS

Living people
British archaeologists
English Assyriologists
Fellows of the Society of Antiquaries of London
Place of birth missing (living people)
1943 births
Alumni of the University of Cambridge
Alumni of SOAS University of London
Academics of the University of Oxford
Fellows of Somerville College, Oxford
British women archaeologists
Assyriologists